Pseudacrossus is a genus of scarab beetles in the family Scarabaeidae. It is distributed across the Palearctic and Nearctic realms.

Species

The genus Pseudacrossus comprises the following species, many of which were previously classified as part of the genus Aphodius:

 Pseudacrossus absconditus (Balthasar, 1932)
 Pseudacrossus beringi Berlov, 1989
 Pseudacrossus grebenscikovi (Balthasar, 1961)
 Pseudacrossus grombczewskyi (Koshantschikov, 1891)
 Pseudacrossus kalabi (Král, 1997)
 Pseudacrossus kuskai (Stebnicka, 1982)
 Pseudacrossus nasutus (Reitter, 1887)
 Pseudacrossus przewalskyi (Reitter, 1887)
 Pseudacrossus qinghaiensis (Král, 1997)
 Pseudacrossus serrimargo (Koshantschikov, 1913)
 Pseudacrossus sharpi (Harold, 1874)
 Pseudacrossus smetanai (Král, 2011)
 Pseudacrossus subsericeus (Ballion, 1878)
 Pseudacrossus suffertus (Schmidt, 1916)
 Pseudacrossus tenebricosus (Schmidt, 1916)
 Pseudacrossus wewalkai (Petrovitz, 1971)
 Pseudacrossus zuercheri (Reitter, 1908)
 Pseudacrossus zurcheri (Reitter, 1908)

References

Scarabaeidae
Scarabaeidae genera